Janel Meilani Parrish Long (born October 30, 1988) is an American actress and singer. She starred as Mona Vanderwaal in the mystery-drama television series Pretty Little Liars (2010–2017) and its spinoff Pretty Little Liars: The Perfectionists (2019), and as Margot Covey in the To All the Boys film series (2018–2021). She also portrayed Young Cosette in the Broadway production of Les Misérables (1996), and Jade in the teen comedy film Bratz (2007).

Early life
Parrish was born in Kāne'ohe, Honolulu, Hawaii, and raised in Honolulu and, in her teens, California. Her mother Joanne (née Mew) is of Han Chinese descent, and her father Mark Parrish, is of German, Irish, and English descent. She has one sister, Melissa Nohelani, who is eight years older and served as an officer in the U.S. Army. Her parents are former bodybuilders, and her mother worked for a Honolulu health club.

At the age of nine, Parrish saw a production of The Phantom of the Opera at the Neal S. Blaisdell Center and fell in love with the idea of performing. She began playing the piano, and within a year was also studying acting, singing, tap and jazz dance. She entered several talent contests, and became well known to local Oahu residents. At age 14, she appeared in the 2003 remake of Star Search, performing the song "On My Own" from Les Misérables. She attended Moanalua Elementary School, and Moanalua High School for her freshman year. Parrish lived in Kaneohe, Hawaii until the age of 14, when she and her family moved to Burbank, Los Angeles so she could pursue a career in the entertainment industry. Parrish was then homeschooled in order to accommodate her work schedule.

Career

Acting
Parrish began her acting career when she was cast as Young Cosette in the National Touring Company of Les Misérables, and later portrayed the role for two months in the Broadway production at the Imperial Theatre. She subsequently appeared in several community theatre productions in Hawaii – most notably as Jean Louise "Scout" Finch in Manoa Valley Theatre's revival of To Kill a Mockingbird in 1998. In 1999, Parrish landed her first substantial television role in NBC's action series Baywatch, appearing in two episodes as Hina, a young girl whom Mitch Buchannon (David Hasselhoff) saves from drowning.

In 2000, Parrish was featured in Disney's live-action television film based on the Pinocchio story Geppetto, portraying the role of Natalie. She then went on to appear as Vanessa in The WB's short-lived sitcom The O'Keefes. Parrish also appeared in shows and made-for-television films on the Disney Channel, and also guest starred in Fox's sitcom The Bernie Mac Show, Nickelodeon's children's comedy-drama series Zoey 101, and Fox's teen drama series The O.C.. Parrish then portrayed Bratz member Jade in the 2007 live-action film Bratz. The role was her first in a motion picture, as well as her first starring role.  She also provided her voice for the Bratz 4 Real video game. In May 2007, shortly before the release of Bratz, she was signed to the William Morris Agency. She then landed a recurring role in the NBC supernatural drama series Heroes.

Parrish played Mona Vanderwaal for the duration of the Freeform teen drama series Pretty Little Liars, based on the book series by Sara Shepard. Mona is introduced in the first season as a teenage outsider who uses her intelligence and resources to torment others anonymously. In March 2012, Parrish was promoted to a series regular for the third season, and stayed a regular for the remainder of the series. For her performance as Mona, she won Choice TV – Villain at the Teen Choice Awards four times from five nominations.

In February 2012, Parrish returned to her stage roots in a production of the musical Spring Awakening. She portrayed Anna, while also understudying the lead female role of Wendla Bergmann. That same year, she had a supporting role in the romantic comedy-drama film Celeste and Jesse Forever. She subsequently guest starred in the CBS drama series Hawaii Five-0, playing the role of Rebecca Fine, an ambitious and strong-willed chemistry student, and made a guest appearance in Lifetime's fantasy legal drama series Drop Dead Diva as cheerleader Chelsea Putnam. Also in 2014, Parrish led the cast of the Lifetime thriller film High School Possession as Lauren Brady. The following year, she had a guest role as villainess Jillian Havemeyer in NBC's comedy-drama series The Mysteries of Laura. In 2017, she guest starred in Fox's procedural drama series Rosewood, playing Selena Monet, a young popstar. In November 2017, Parrish began portraying Sandy Dumbrowski in a Toronto production of Grease, alongside Katie Findlay. She then portrayed Lisa Wagner in the romance film Until We Meet Again, alongside Jackson Rathbone.

Parrish co-starred as Margot Covey in the film adaptation of Jenny Han's young adult romance novel To All the Boys I've Loved Before, with Lana Condor and John Corbett, and appeared alongside Angela Trimbur and Fairuza Balk in the home-invasion thriller Hell Is Where the Home Is. Parrish will co-star with Mickey Rourke in the upcoming boxing drama Tiger. She reprised her role as Mona Vanderwaal in the Pretty Little Liars spin-off drama series, Pretty Little Liars: The Perfectionists. The show premiered on Freeform on March 20, 2019 and concluded on May 22, 2019.

Music
At age eight, Parrish won a statewide singing competition in Hawaii. She began writing her own music as a teenager and eventually became the lead singer of the three-piece girl group, Impulse. In 2007, Parrish was signed to Geffen Records as a solo artist to produce her first album. Her first single, "Rainy Day", which she wrote herself, and its music video, was released on July 7, 2007. The song also featured on the Bratz soundtrack. Parrish made appearances in Prima J's music video for "Rockstar" and NLT's music video for "She Said, I Said", which were both featured on the Bratz soundtrack. She also provided background vocals for the latter. In April 2015, she released two songs, "Heart Made of Stone" and "Senseless", both of which she co-wrote with Vince Pizzinga.

Other ventures
In August 2014, Parrish was announced as one of the celebrities competing on the 19th season of Dancing with the Stars. She was paired with professional dancer Valentin Chmerkovskiy. During week three, "Movie Night", the couple became the first to earn a perfect score with their Jazz dance, and held the record for earliest perfect score on the show (the record was later matched by Bethany Mota and her partner Derek Hough on the same night). Parrish and Chmerkovskiy reached the final but ended up in third place, behind Alfonso Ribeiro and Sadie Robertson, who took first and second place respectively.

She modeled Camille La Vie & Group USA's prom dresses for Seventeen magazine and served as a special guest judge at the annual Camille La Vie & Group USA and Seventeen's "Celebrity Prom" event in March 2014. She has graced the covers of numerous fashion magazines, including Nationalist, Pulse Spikes, Luca, Vulkan and Modeliste.

Parrish is popular on social media and endorses products such as beauty and wellness products on Instagram. She has partnered with several brands, including Room & Board Modern Furniture products, Robitussin cold relief, Beauty Rest Black mattress and Glade candles.

Philanthropy 
In October 2018, she appeared in an anti-bullying public service announcement for Disney and ABC’s #ChooseKindness campaign with Sasha Pieterse for National Bullying Prevention Month. "I have had experiences being bullied. For me, it was definitely high school. I was not the popular girl at all," she told People magazine.

Personal life
Parrish began dating chemical engineer Chris Long in September 2016, and became engaged to him on October 23, 2017. They married on September 8, 2018 at Kualoa Ranch, Oahu, Hawaii. Her father-in-law was killed by a drunk driver two weeks before the wedding. "We went to Hawaii and we had the most beautiful day, and during our vows, when Chris started talking about his dad, the sky opened up and it just started pouring rain on us. It was such a beautiful, I mean I don't think anybody was dry eyed, like everybody cried because it was such a beautiful moment," Parrish recalled to ET in 2019.

Filmography

Film

Television

Music videos

Stage

Discography

Singles

Promotional singles

Soundtrack

Awards and nominations

References

External links

 
 
 Q & A on Being "A"

1988 births
20th-century American actresses
21st-century American actresses
21st-century American singers
21st-century American pianists
21st-century American women singers
Actresses from Honolulu
American actresses of Chinese descent
American child actresses
American women pop singers
American women singer-songwriters
American film actresses
American musical theatre actresses
American musicians of Chinese descent
American stage actresses
American television actresses
Geffen Records artists
Living people
Musicians from Honolulu
Singer-songwriters from Hawaii
21st-century women pianists